Blakistonia is a genus of Australian armored trapdoor spiders that was first described by Henry Roughton Hogg in 1902.

Species
 it contains twenty species:
Blakistonia aurea Hogg, 1902 (type) – Australia (South Australia, Victoria, New South Wales)
Blakistonia bassi Harrison, Rix, Harvey & Austin, 2018 – Australia (South Australia)
Blakistonia bella Harrison, Rix, Harvey & Austin, 2018 – Australia (South Australia)
Blakistonia birksi Harrison, Rix, Harvey & Austin, 2018 – Australia (South Australia, Victoria)
Blakistonia carnarvon Harrison, Rix, Harvey & Austin, 2018 – Australia (Queensland)
Blakistonia emmottorum Harrison, Rix, Harvey & Austin, 2018 – Australia (Queensland)
Blakistonia gemmelli Harrison, Rix, Harvey & Austin, 2018 – Australia (South Australia)
Blakistonia hortoni Harrison, Rix, Harvey & Austin, 2018 – Australia (South Australia)
Blakistonia mainae Harrison, Rix, Harvey & Austin, 2018 – Australia (Western Australia)
Blakistonia maryae Harrison, Rix, Harvey & Austin, 2018 – Australia (South Australia)
Blakistonia newtoni Harrison, Rix, Harvey & Austin, 2018 – Australia (South Australia)
Blakistonia nullarborensis Harrison, Rix, Harvey & Austin, 2018 – Australia (Western Australia)
Blakistonia olea Harrison, Rix, Harvey & Austin, 2018 – Australia (Western Australia)
Blakistonia parva Harrison, Rix, Harvey & Austin, 2018 – Australia (South Australia)
Blakistonia pidax Harrison, Rix, Harvey & Austin, 2018 – Australia (South Australia)
Blakistonia plata Harrison, Rix, Harvey & Austin, 2018 – Australia (Queensland)
Blakistonia raveni Harrison, Rix, Harvey & Austin, 2018 – Australia (Queensland)
Blakistonia tariae Harrison, Rix, Harvey & Austin, 2018 – Australia (Western Australia)
Blakistonia tunstilli Harrison, Rix, Harvey & Austin, 2018 – Australia (South Australia)
Blakistonia wingellina Harrison, Rix, Harvey & Austin, 2018 – Australia (Western Australia)

References

External links	

Idiopidae
Mygalomorphae genera
Spiders of Australia